Duncan Mackay (born 26 July 1950) is a British composer, singer, arranger, and keyboard player who has recorded eight solo albums as well as collaborations. He was born in Leeds, Yorkshire, England.

He played with Steve Harley & Cockney Rebel from 1974 to 1977 and 10cc from 1978 to 1981, and also played on Kate Bush's first three albums, The Kick Inside, Lionheart (both 1978) and Never for Ever (1980), as well as Camel's 1981 album Nude, and Budgie's 1982 album Deliver Us from Evil. In the early 1980s, he was briefly considered for the keyboard player position in Yes.

In 2004, he completed an album with South African singer/composer Greg McEwan-Kocovaos, The First Time. This indie album received its first airplay on Radio Caroline by the veteran UK DJ Martin Turner and was reviewed by the official 10cc fan site.

Mackay's daughter Fawn James is the granddaughter of Paul Raymond.

Discography 
Solo
Chimera (1974)
Score (1977)
Visa (1980)
The Heart of the Machine (1988)
The New Explorers (1988)
Forward Vision (1988) (EP)
Data First (1988)
Russell Grant's Zodiac (1990)
A Picture of Sound (2017) (1993)
Kintsugi (2019)

Steve Harley & Cockney Rebel
The Best Years of Our Lives (1975)
Timeless Flight (1976)
Love's a Prima Donna (1976)

The Alan Parsons Project
I Robot (1977)
Pyramid (1978)
Eve (1979)

10cc
Bloody Tourists (1978)
Look Hear? (1980)

Kate Bush
The Kick Inside (1978)
Lionheart (1978 )
Never for Ever (1980)

Camel
Nude (1981)
The Single Factor (1982)

Budgie
Deliver Us from Evil (1982)

with Greg McEwan Kocovaos
The First Time (2004)

with Georg Voros
For Johann (2015) (EP)
The Bletchley Park Project (2017)

with Fluance
Lunacy (2020)

Rebeka Rain, Mick Evans, Duncan MacKay
Painted Secrets (2018) 
7 Whispers (2018) (single)
The point (2019) (single)
Not Meant For Me (2019) (single)
Gone Insane (2019) (single)
Your life (2019) (single)
Learn To Live (2020) (single)
As The Sun Goes Down (2020) (single)

References

External links 
 Duncan Mackay discography and album reviews, credits & releases at AllMusic
 Duncan Mackay discography, album releases & credits at Discogs.com
 Duncan Mackay albums to be listened as stream at Spotify.com

1950 births
Living people
10cc members
Musicians from Leeds
English rock keyboardists
The Alan Parsons Project members
Steve Harley & Cockney Rebel members
English expatriates in South Africa